The 1983 SEC Men’s Basketball Tournament took place from March 10–13, 1983 at the Birmingham-Jefferson Convention Complex in Birmingham, Alabama. the Georgia Bulldogs won the tournament championship title, and received the SEC’s automatic bid to the 1983 NCAA Division I Men’s Basketball tournament. This tournament marked Georgia’s first ever SEC tournament championship title.

Television coverage of the tournament’s first three rounds was produced and regionally syndicated by the TVS Television Network, with CBS broadcasting the championship game nationally. Tom Hammond handled play-by-play commentary, while Joe Dean provided color analogy.

Bracket

References

SEC men's basketball tournament
1982–83 Southeastern Conference men's basketball season
1983 in sports in Alabama
Basketball competitions in Birmingham, Alabama
College basketball tournaments in Alabama